The 2016–17 season was F.C. Motagua's 70th season in existence and the club's 51st consecutive season in the top fight of Honduran football.  The club announced the continuation of Diego Vásquez as the team's head coach for his 4th consecutive season.

Overview
This season, the club fought for its 14th league and 2nd domestic cup.  During the preseason, a new badge was unveiled to be used starting this season.  On 2 July, the club's president Eduardo Atala confirmed an exhibition game against current Copa Libertadores winners at that time and South American giants River Plate.  The game was played at Orlando, United States.

The Apertura schedule was unveiled on the second week of July and the club decided to return their home games on Sundays afternoon after their last season experiment of playing on Saturdays seeking for better assistances didn't throw the expected results.  In week 6, Motagua faced C.D. Social Sol at home; in the 50' minute (0–0), the referee decided to suspend the match due to heavy rain which caused a power outage.  The remaining 40 minutes were played the following morning, landing in the club's 88th anniversary.  Román Castillo who had lost his younger brother a week prior, decided the match with a late goal at the 90th+5 minute.  On 25 September, Motagua had to move its home game against C.D. Honduras Progreso to Catacamas due to a religious event that took place at Estadio Tiburcio Carías Andino.  This match at Catacamas marked history in the Honduran Liga Nacional as the first game ever officiated by a female referee.  On week 17, a 2–2 away tie against Real C.D. España defined Motagua's 4th place in the regular season standings and therefore, a berth to the playoffs phase.  Once in the playoffs, Motagua defeated C.D. Marathón away in postseason for the first time since November 1990; however, the access to the semifinals didn't turn out that easy as Motagua had to rely on a late and controversial penalty in the second leg to advance with a 3–3 global score.  In the semifinals Motagua faced city rivals Club Deportivo Olimpia for another edition of the Honduran Superclásico, resulting in the fourth time these two teams meet in this stage in the last three years.  With a 2–1 aggregated score, Motagua moved on and qualified to their 19th league final in history.  On 18 December, Motagua obtained their 14th national championship after defeating Platense F.C. in an unprecedented final.  It was also the first time a league title was decided at Puerto Cortés.  With the win, the team secured a spot for next season's CONCACAF club competitions.

Motagua started the Clausura tournament playing at Puerto Cortés losing 1–2 against Platense.  On 21 January, Motagua traveled to Goascorán to play against Gremio F.C. for the first round of the 2017 Honduran Cup, a competition which ended way too early for Motagua's aspirations as they lost in penalty shootouts against a club that plays in third division.  On 8 February, Diego Vásquez broke an all-time Liga Nacional record as the coach with the most number of consecutive games leading a team, totaling 140 games, surpassing Julio González (139 with C.D. Victoria).  On 19 February, Motagua suffered their biggest defeat ever in Tocoa in the 0–4 loss to C.D. Real Sociedad.  This result also marked the 11th unsuccessful try to obtain a victory at this venue since Real Sociedad's promotion in 2012.  On 13 March, the club announced through their social media that Argentinian midfielder Santiago Vergara was being treated in a local health center as he was diagnosed with leukemia.  Once in the post-season, Motagua defeated Real España for the first time ever in a semifinal.  Despite losing key players from their roster, Motagua was capable of finishing the Clausura tournament with 14 unbeaten games in a row, a performance that resulted in their 15th league championship and a season's double.  The Clausura final was played against C.D. Honduras Progreso, which marked their second meeting at this stage in less than two years.  Motagua established a record as the largest goal difference in a final's global score (7–1).  With the win, the team secured a spot for the 2018 CONCACAF Champions League.

Before the start of the final match against Honduras Progreso, the selling of fake tickets in the black market triggered a chaos among the fans inside and outside the stadium.  Those still outside with ticket in hand precipitated towards one of the gates forming a human avalanche that killed 4 people due to asphyxiation.

Kit
The 2016–17 kits were officially published on 12 July, one day before their friendly meeting against River Plate.  Joma stayed as the kits manufacturer for the 17th straight season and Pepsi as the main sponsor.  Other sponsors include Claro, Diunsa, Gatorade and Retlan.  In April, a special kit allusive to the 14th championship was released to be used for the rest of the season.

Players

Transfers in

Transfers out

Squad
 Statistics as of 28 May 2017
 Only league matches into account

Results

Preseason and friendlies

Apertura

Clausura

Honduran Cup

By round

Statistics
 As of 28 May 2017

External links
 Official website

References

F.C. Motagua seasons
Motagua
Motagua